The 1999 Road Wild was the fourth and final Road Wild professional wrestling pay-per-view (PPV) event produced by World Championship Wrestling (WCW). It took place on August 14, 1999, from the Sturgis Motorcycle Rally in Sturgis, South Dakota.

In the main event, Hulk Hogan defeated Kevin Nash in a retirement match to retain the WCW World Heavyweight Championship, forcing Nash to retire from professional wrestling. Nash would come out of retirement in late 1999. This was Hogan's fourth straight Road Wild main event match. Other important matches on the card featured Randy Savage defeating Dennis Rodman, Goldberg defeating Rick Steiner, Sid Vicious defeating Sting and Chris Benoit retained the WCW United States Heavyweight Championship against Diamond Dallas Page in a No Disqualification match. The event also featured Filthy Animals vs. Dead Pool and The Revolution vs. The West Texas Rednecks.

Storylines
The event featured wrestlers from pre-existing scripted feuds and storylines. Wrestlers portrayed villains, heroes, or less distinguishable characters in the scripted events that built tension and culminated in a wrestling match or series of matches.

Event

Fit Finlay was scheduled to face Jimmy Hart's First Family, but Finlay suffered a severe injury prior to the event. A match scheduled between Madusa and Mona also did not take place without any official reason given.

Reception
In 2011, Jack Bramma of 411Mania gave the event a rating of 4.5 [Poor], stating, "The dredges of mediocrity. WCW had over a year left but they were already losing significant steam by this point. I think the idea of an outdoor PPV at Sturgis could have been a lot of fun but most of the work here is just bad to average and the booking is ass. Maybe watch the 6 man tag to see some fine attention to detail from Hennig or the DDP-Benoit encounter if you don't want to see the three-ways with Raven from a couple of years prior."

Results

References

Road Wild
1999 in South Dakota
Events in South Dakota
Professional wrestling in Sturgis, South Dakota
August 1999 events in the United States
1999 World Championship Wrestling pay-per-view events